Edward Boyce (2 June 1913 – 26 March 1988) was a British athlete. He competed in the men's long jump and the men's triple jump at the 1936 Summer Olympics.

References

External links
 

1913 births
1988 deaths
Athletes (track and field) at the 1934 British Empire Games
Commonwealth Games competitors for Northern Ireland
Athletes (track and field) at the 1936 Summer Olympics
British male long jumpers
British male triple jumpers
Olympic athletes of Great Britain
Sportspeople from Belfast
Male athletes from Northern Ireland